Fort Nichols could refer to:
Fort Nichols (Massachusetts), a former fort in the state
Fort Nichols (Oklahoma), another name for Camp Nichols